Thomas V. "T. J." Jackson (born May 27, 1980) is an American professional basketball coach, and a former professional basketball player.

Career
Jackson signed with the German BBC Bayreuth for the 2009–10 season. Bayreuth promoted to the Basketball Bundesliga that season. He was released after the season.

Jackson signed with Dutch team Zorg en Zekerheid Leiden for the 2010–11 season. He resigned after one year.

In October 2012 Jackson signed with Uppsala Basket from Uppsala, Sweden.

Coaching career
On start of 2017–18 season the Erie BayHawks added Jackson to the coaching staff as assistant coach.

Honours

Club
ZZ Leiden
Dutch Basketball League (1): 2010–11
NBB Cup (1): 2011–12
Dutch Basketball Supercup (1): 2012
Bayreuth
Pro A (1): 2009–10

Individual
Sallen
 Basketligan All-Star (1): 2007
ZZ Leiden
DBL All-Star (1): 2012

References

External links
R.H. Consultancy profile 
Eurobasket.com profile
RealGM.com profile

1980 births
Living people
American expatriate basketball people in Germany
American expatriate basketball people in Sweden
American expatriate basketball people in the Netherlands
B.S. Leiden players
Basketball coaches from Michigan
Basketball players from Michigan
Butler Bulldogs men's basketball players
Dutch Basketball League players
Erie BayHawks (2017–2019) coaches
People from East Lansing, Michigan
Point guards
Uppsala Basket players
American men's basketball players